The Jeep Grand Cherokee (WJ) is the second generation of the Jeep Grand Cherokee sport utility vehicle. Unveiled in Detroit, Michigan on June 16, 1998, production lasted until 2004 in the US, continuing in foreign markets until 2005. The WJ was completely overhauled from its ZJ predecessor, and was renowned for its off-road capability. Jeep marketed the (WJ) as "the most capable SUV ever."

Background
Unveiled at Detroit, MI Cobo Hall on June 16, 1998, the redesigned WJ 1999 Grand Cherokee shared just 127 parts with its predecessor (mostly fasteners) and took 28 months to develop from its March 1996 design freeze (styling approval in Q3 1995). The spare tire was relocated from the side of the cargo compartment to under the floor. The two heavy pushrod V8 engines were replaced by Chrysler's then-new PowerTech. The new V8 engine produced less torque than the old pushrods, but was lighter, offered better fuel economy, and provided similar on road performance figures (the 23-gallon fuel tank was replaced with one of a 20.5-gallon capacity). The Inline 6 engine was also updated for MY1999. A redesign of the intake manifold added . While other Jeep vehicles used the Mopar 5 x 4.5 bolt circle, this was the first Jeep following the 1987 Chrysler buyout to receive a wider wheel bolt pattern: – 5 x 5 - (metric 5 x 127mm).

A notable feature available in this generation was the automatic four wheel drive option called Quadra-Drive, which employed the New Venture Gear NV247 transfer case. This two-speed chain-driven transfer case uses a gerotor, a clutch pack coupled to a hydraulic pump, to transfer torque between the front and rear axles. The transfer case contains three modes, 4-All Time, Neutral, and 4-Lo. In 4-All Time, 100% of torque is sent to the rear axle in normal conditions. If the rear axle starts spinning at a higher rate than the front axle, hydraulic pressure builds up in the gerotor and causes the clutch pack to progressively transfer torque to the front axle until both axles return to the same speed. Neutral mode is intended for towing the vehicle. In 4-Lo, the front and rear axles are locked together through a 2.72 reduction gear ratio. The NV247 transfer case is mated to front and rear axles containing Jeep's Vari-Lok differentials. Vari-Lok differentials also use a gerotor to transfer torque between the wheels on either side of the axle. The major advantage of Quadra-Drive was that the combined transfer case and progressive locking differentials in each axle could automatically control traction between all four wheels. However, only the center differential could be permanently locked, and only in 4Lo. The Quadra-Trac II system included the NV247 transfer case with the standard open front and rear differentials.

The 45RFE and 545RFE automatic transmission in the WJ was notable. It included three planetary gear sets rather than the two normally used in a four-speed automatic. This gave it six theoretical speeds, and it would have been the first six-speed transmission ever produced in volume, but it was programmed to only use five of these ratios. Four were used for upshifts, with a different second gear for downshifts. Although five of the six ratios were used, Chrysler decided to call it a "4-speed automatic". In 2001, the programming was changed to make use of all six ratios. Rather than have six forward gears, the transmission was programmed to act as a five-speed with the alternate second gear for downshifts. The 42RE 4-speed automatic remained the transmission for the Inline 6 engine. It had slight changes from the previous model Grand Cherokee.

The interior was also completely redesigned. The redesign allowed for larger rear doors, and more space for rear passengers. Controls for various items like headlights, heated seats, and rear wiper were moved to more convenient locations. The electronic Vehicle Information Center was moved from below the radio to above the windshield, and was standard on all 2000 and up models. Limited models included automatic dual-zone climate control. A 10 CD-Changer was also available with the Infinity Audio package.

In addition to Jeep's UniFrame construction, Daimler Chrysler partnered with Porsche to further strengthen the frame. This was done to reduce NVH (noise, vibration, and harshness). UniFrame is an unusual construction scheme, it incorporates all of the strength and durability of a body-on-frame construction into a unitized construction. By adding stiffness and rigidity to the structure, they enhanced the ride and strengthened the network of steel beams, rails and pillars (or "safety cage") that surround and protect occupants. More than 70 percent of the underbody is high-strength steel. All Jeep Grand Cherokees feature UniFrame construction.

The Grand Cherokee received a secondary minor facelift for 2004 including round fog lamps, a lower front fascia and a new body-color matched inset grille design.

Export models produced at the plant in Graz, Austria, were given the vehicle designation of "WG", which feature minor differences from the US model, including a relocated radio antenna (moved from front right fender to integrated on rear passenger side window), power folding mirrors, height adjustable headlights, plastic rocker covers on Limited trim models (only available on Laredo trim on US models), as well as leather shift knobs on Overland trim models. Chrysler also claims the vehicle received other improvements to reduce "NVH".  "WG" models were also manufactured at the Cordoba plant for the Argentinian market.

New features 

The first-generation Jeep Grand Cherokee (ZJ) offered many new and class-exclusive features, and the second-generation Jeep Grand Cherokee WJ continued to offer new features that were not yet available on its competitors, such as the Chevrolet Blazer and Ford Explorer.

At the time of its release, the all-new 1999 Jeep Grand Cherokee WJ had many standard and optional features which were class-exclusive. HomeLink allowed the driver to program up to three devices such as garage door openers, estate gates, and other controlled access devices and operate those devices with buttons located in the overhead console. A state-of-the-art automatic dual-zone climate control system used infrared sensors located in the climate control panel to monitor the surface temperature of both driver and front passenger to automatically control the interior temperature for both front passengers. The Jeep Memory System allowed for two drivers to set their individual driver's seat, side mirror, and radio setting by using buttons located on the front driver's door interior panel to recall their preferred settings at the touch of a button, or upon insertion of the corresponding key into the ignition (the keyless entry remotes were color-coded either black or gray, and had either a '1' or '2' on the back of the remote to help the drivers easily identify their remote).

In 2002, the Jeep Grand Cherokee WJ added even more new features. These new features included power-adjustable foot pedals via a switch located on the driver's side near the steering wheel (the pedals also worked in conjunction with the Jeep Memory System to adjust automatically to a driver's preferred settings when a button on the front driver's door interior panel was depressed). Optional SRS Side Curtain Airbags for the front passengers were available on all Grand Cherokee models for added protection. The Uconnect hands-free Bluetooth telephone system allowed the driver to pair his or her Bluetooth-enabled cellular phone to the system and make and receive hands-free telephone calls without having to handle their phone, and the driver could even store frequently-called telephone numbers in the system's memory for automatic dialing via voice. The button panel for the system was located on the front driver's door interior panel. Sirius Satellite Radio was also available for the first time regardless of factory radio option. The Jeep Grand Cherokee was one of the first vehicles to offer these features from the factory.

Yearly changes 

1999 - 1999 saw the introduction of the all-new, second-generation Jeep Grand Cherokee WJ. While similar in dimensions and style to the first-generation Jeep Grand Cherokee (ZJ), the WJ Grand Cherokee featured a more modern exterior design, and an all-new interior. While the 4.0L "Power-Tech" Inline Six-Cylinder (I6) engine and 42RE four-speed automatic transmission both carried over from the previous-generation model, the previous 5.2L "Magnum" V8 engine was replaced by an all-new 4.7L "Power-Tech" V8 engine, which was mated to the all-new 45RFE four-speed automatic transmission (the 5.9L "Magnum" V8 engine was dropped after the 1998 model year). The spare tire and wheel were relocated from the left side of the rear cargo area to underneath the cargo floor. This decreased on available cargo space, but made it easier to access the spare tire and wheel.

2000 - Having been fully redesigned for the 1999 model year, the 2000 Jeep Grand Cherokee received minimal changes. However, the 4.7L "Power-Tech" V8 engine's 45RFE four-speed automatic transmission was replaced by the 545RFE five-speed automatic transmission. Finally, the base Laredo "D" Package was discontinued, which meant that the Laredo model now included the Electronic Vehicle Information Center (EVIC) with an overhead console as standard equipment.

2001 - For 2001, a 60th Anniversary Edition Jeep Grand Cherokee, based on the Limited model, celebrated the Brand's sixtieth anniversary. A new New England Edition Package for the base Laredo added seventeen-inch tires and "Silverblade" aluminum-alloy wheels, a combination A/M-F/M stereo radio with cassette and CD players, and a power-adjustable front driver's seat to the base model. Another new package for the Laredo included the same feature content, but also added "Royale" leather-trimmed seating surfaces and an Infinity Gold premium audio system with a 180-watt amplifier. All models of the Grand Cherokee received new aluminum-alloy wheel options, and the Limited trim received new leather seating surfaces and revised burl rosewood interior trim (the Laredo model received simulated brushed aluminum interior trim, and now included a trim bezel around the radio). The steering wheel on all models also received a silver-finished 'Jeep' emblem.

2002 - For 2002 the Grand Cherokee WJ a major refresh which introduced new features and models to the range, as well as minor changes related to cost cutting measures. To start, an all-new Jeep Grand Cherokee Overland model was introduced, as a new model positioned above the previously-top Limited model, including features such as extended leather seating surfaces and door panels, an Infinity Gold premium amplified audio system, as well as genuine wood-trimmed interior and steering wheel. 

The Laredo trim now included a six-way, power-adjustable front driver's seat and an A/M-F/M stereo radio with a single-disc CD player a standard equipment, as well as revised seat fabrics, and new "Silverblade" aluminum-alloy wheels. Midyear, a new Special Edition model was introduced based on the Laredo model that added color-keyed front and rear bumpers and body side cladding, an Infinity Gold 180-watt premium amplified audio system, and unique badging on the front doors of the vehicle. A new "High Output" 4.7L "Power-Tech" V8 engine became available, standard on Overland, and optional on Limited. All radios (aside from the base "RBK" A/M-F/M stereo radio) now included Radio Data System (RDS) capabilities, and side-impact airbags were now an option on all models. 

2003 - For 2003, the Jeep Grand Cherokee gained a new "Freedom Edition" model, based on the Laredo trim, while the Sport model was discontinued. The Laredo model now included high-back front bucket seats with integrated headrests as standard equipment, with low-back front bucket seats with separate headrests becoming an option (the low-back bucket seats were standard when the Laredo trim was ordered with the optional "Royale" leather-trimmed seating surfaces). New entertainment options, including a GPS navigation system radio and Sirius Satellite Radio were offered for the first time. The Special Edition model was temporarily discontinued for the 2003 model year, but would reappear for 2004. 2003 was a shortened model year, with 2004 model year production commencing in mid-2003. During this year the WJ also received to minor changes during the model year, including the change from a functional oil pressure gauge to a "dummy" gauge (only showing if oil pressure is present or not), as well as changing from a hollow to a solid front sway bar starting on vehicles made after November 7, 2002 onwards. 

2004 - 2004 would mark the Jeep Grand Cherokee WJ's final model year of production. There was a new Columbia Edition model that was introduced as a partnership between Jeep and Columbia Sportswear, and included unique seat trim, larger aluminum-alloy wheels, and a complimentary Columbia parka (the Special Edition trim would also reappear for the 2004 model year). The Laredo trim was condensed to a single "E" Package, though all previously-available options were still available. All models received revised front fascias for 2004, and all four wheel drive models received Jeep's new "Trail Rated 4X4" certification, with a badge being placed on the front driver's side fender. Production concluded in April 2004, with the all-new Jeep Grand Cherokee (WK) being introduced in the same month at the New York International Auto Show.

Models 

The Laredo served as the base Grand Cherokee trim level from August 1998 to 2004, and still continues to be the base Grand Cherokee trim level to this day. A very well-equipped model, the Laredo offered these features as standard equipment: the 4.0L Power-Tech Inline Six-Cylinder (I6) engine, a 4-speed automatic transmission, sixteen-inch (16") alloy wheels, an A/M-F/M stereo with cassette and CD player (1998-2001) or CD players (2001-2004), wood interior trim (1998-2000) or aluminum interior trim (2000-2004), keyless entry, power windows and door locks, cloth seating surfaces, air conditioning, a split-folding 60/40 rear bench seat, gray-painted front and rear bumpers and body-side cladding trim panels, and more. After MY1999, the Laredo 26D Package was dropped, leaving the Laredo 26E/28E Packages as the base Grand Cherokee packages, and adding a standard overhead Electronic Vehicle Information Center (EVIC/VIC) and overhead console. Many features that were available on the luxurious Limited trim could also be optioned on the base Laredo trim. For 2001 only, a New England Special Group was available for Grand Cherokees equipped with the 26E Package. The package, which was indicated by the sales code ACJ, added features to the base model Grand Cherokee such as P235/65R17 BSW all-season performance tires, seventeen-inch (17") sport alloy wheels (both options of which were also available with the 26S and 28S Packages), an A/M-F/M stereo with cassette and CD players with integrated remote CD changer controls, and a 3.73 rear axle ratio. The New England Special Group was available exclusively in select Northeastern states.

The Limited served as the top-of-the-line Grand Cherokee trim level from 1998 to 2001, and the more "luxurious" Grand Cherokee trim level from 2001 to 2004. It added these features: color-keyed body-side trim cladding panels and front and rear bumpers, a premium 180-watt Infinity Gold stereo system with 6 speakers, leather seating surfaces, dual power front bucket seats, a full-sized spare tire and spare wheel, a security alarm, a leather-wrapped steering wheel, steering wheel-mounted remote audio system controls, driver's 2-position memory (color-coded keyless entry remotes), wood interior trim, and more.

The Sport was the lowest-priced trim level of the Grand Cherokee was introduced in November 2001, for MY2002. Offered only for 2002, the Sport was aimed at value-oriented customers who wanted a very well-equipped vehicle at a modest price point. It added these features to the base Laredo trim: dual power front heated bucket seats, leather seating surfaces, an A/M-F/M stereo with cassette and CD players, a premium 180-watt Infinity Gold audio system with 6 speakers, a full-sized spare tire and spare wheel, a 'sport' emblem on the tailgate, a security alarm, a power sunroof, and more. Cloth seating surfaces, deleted heated front bucket seats, a deleted cassette player, and a deleted sunroof could be had for credit in place of the standard options they replaced.

The Special Edition was a value-oriented trim level of the Grand Cherokee in 2002 and in 2004 (the model was put on hiatus for the 2003 model year). Based on the base Laredo trim, the Special Edition added these features: a full-sized spare tire/wheel, heated power dual front bucket seats, leather seating surfaces & leather-wrapped steering wheel, an A/M-F/M stereo with cassette, CD player, 10 disc rear mounted CD changer, color-keyed body-side cladding panels and front and rear bumpers, a security alarm, power sunroof, and 'Special Edition' emblems on both front doors (the 2004 model did not have heated power dual front bucket seats, leather seating surfaces & leather-wrapped steering wheel", only power seats. The power sunroof was an option)

The Freedom was a value-oriented trim level of the Grand Cherokee between March 2003 (SOP 2003/03/10) and 2004. Based on the base Laredo trim, the Freedom added these features: a full-sized spare tire and spare wheel, seventeen-inch (17") graphite-finish alloy wheels, unique cloth seating surfaces, dual power front bucket seats, an A/M-F/M stereo with cassette and CD players, a premium 180-watt Infinity Gold audio system with 6 speakers, and 'Freedom' emblems on both front doors.

The Columbia Edition, launched in November 2003 (2003/10/06 SOP) was a partnership between Jeep and sportswear manufacturer Columbia for MY2004. Based on the base Laredo trim, the Columbia Edition added these features: a full-sized spare tire and spare wheel, seventeen-inch (17") alloy wheels, unique two-toned cloth seating surfaces, dual power front bucket seats, an A/M-F/M stereo with cassette and CD players, a premium 180-watt Infinity Gold audio system with 6 speakers, Bright Silver Metallic-painted body-side cladding panels and front and rear bumpers, and 'Columbia Edition' emblems on both front doors. Columbia Edition buyers also received a complimentary Columbia parka at the time of delivery of their new vehicle.

The Overland was the top-of-the-line Grand Cherokee trim level between August 2001 and 2004, first introduced for MY2002. It added these features to the already-luxurious Limited trim level: an A/M-F/M stereo with cassette and CD players, a ten-disc remote rear-mounted CD changer, unique leather-and-suede seating surfaces, woodgrain (real redwood) for upper half of steering wheel and interior accents, dual power heated front bucket seats, Overland floor mats, 'Overland' emblems on both front doors, side curtain air bags, rain sense wipers, rock rails, Up Country Suspension (option was deleted for the MY2004 starting Sept 2003) Skid Plate Group with chrome tow hooks, unique seventeen-inch (17") chrome-plated alloy wheels with matching spare, a power sunroof, and the higher-output (265 hp) 4.7L Power-Tech V8 engine, which could also be had on the Limited trim.

The 60th Anniversary Edition was manufactured to commemorate Jeep's 60th anniversary in 2001. It added these features to the luxurious Limited trim level: unique seventeen-inch (17") "Rogue" chrome-plated alloy wheels, '60th Anniversary Edition' emblems on both upper front fenders, heated front bucket seats, a power sunroof, an A/M-F/M stereo with cassette and CD players, a matching spare wheel, '60th Anniversary Edition'-embroidered front bucket seats, along with special 60th Anniversary Edition floor mats.

Chinese production 

Beijing Jeep Corporation, Ltd. produced the XJ classic Cherokee from 1984 to 2005. Beijing Jeep bought the old tooling for the WJ Grand Cherokee when the WK was introduced for the U.S. as a 2005 model. The WJ was introduced in the end of 2004 for the Chinese market as the Jeep 4000 and 4700 Grand Cherokee and carries differing engine names compared to their foreign counterparts known as C698QA1 for the 6 cylinder and C8V93Q for the V8. A 4 speed automatic gearbox was standard on the 6 cylinder while V8 had a 5 speed automatic gearbox. Pricing ranges 358,000 and 496,000 yuan (53,480 to US$74,090) with four trim levels.

It was their flagship model and nearly identical to the 2004 Grand Cherokee Limited in looks and equipment, including the solid axle suspension, choice of 4wd systems, body color cladding, alloy wheels, Chrysler sound systems, and Chrysler automatic climate controls. This is unlike the XJ Cherokee that was significantly modified by Beijing Jeep for the Chinese market.

Engines

Detroit Diesel/VM Motori 
The 3.1 liter turbo-diesel on the 1999 Grand Cherokee was developed in conjunction with Detroit Diesel/VM Motori. It has an electronic injection pump, electronically controlled, vacuum-actuated exhaust gas recirculation, and a special catalyst to control oxides of nitrogen (NOx). Manufactured in Cento, Italy, at 13,000 units per year. It was available in European models and meets the European stage III emissions.
 Displacement: 
 Power: 
 Torque: 
 Transmission: Four speed electronically controlled automatic

Sales 
The Jeep Grand Cherokee WJ and WG went into production in July 17th, 1998 and finished its run on May 21st, 2004.

Safety

Insurance Institute for Highway Safety (IIHS)

NHTSA

*Note: Only 2001-2003 models rated

Recalls
On November 8, 2012, Chrysler announced the recall on certain model year 2002 though 2004 Jeep Grand Cherokee vehicles manufactured February 13, 2001, through May 23, 2003. A component in the air bag control module may fail causing the front airbags, side curtain airbags, and/or seatbelt pretensioners to deploy inadvertently while the vehicle is being operated.

References

Inline

General

External links

 

Grand Cherokee (WJ)
Cars introduced in 1998
2000s cars
All-wheel-drive vehicles
Mid-size sport utility vehicles
Motor vehicles manufactured in the United States